The 1997 NCAA Division II Men's Soccer Championship was the 26th annual tournament held by the NCAA to determine the top men's Division II college soccer program in the United States.

Cal State Bakersfield (20-4) defeated Lynn, 1–0, in the tournament final. This was the first national title for the Roadrunners, who were coached by Simon Tobin.

Bracket

Final

See also  
 NCAA Division I Men's Soccer Championship
 NCAA Division III Men's Soccer Championship
 NAIA Men's Soccer Championship

References 

NCAA Division II Men's Soccer Championship
NCAA Division II Men's Soccer Championship
NCAA Division II Men's Soccer Championship
NCAA Division II Men's Soccer Championship